C+C Music Factory is the third and final studio album of new material to be recorded by C+C Music Factory. The album was not released in the United States. This was the group's first album since the death of David Cole.

Track listing
 "What Can I Do (To Make You Stay)" - 4:08
 "Don't Stop the Music" (featuring Charlie Brown and Greg Nice) - 4:12 
 "I'll Always Be Around" - 4:31
 "Loving You" - 4:30
 "Searching" - 4:20
 "Till the End of Time" - 4:56
 "Still" - 5:30
 "I Wanna Blow Your Mind" - 5:53
 "It's So Easy to Love You" - 3:57
 "Musica Es Mi Vida" (Robi-Rob's Boriqua Anthem Part 2) - 20:23
 "Latinos Del Mundo (Siguen Bailando)" - 11:10

References

1995 albums
C+C Music Factory albums
MCA Records albums